Gadi Chaid (born ) is a South African male  track cyclist, and part of the national team. He competed in the 1 km time trial event at the 2009 UCI Track Cycling World Championships.

References

External links
 Profile at cyclingarchives.com

1986 births
Living people
South African track cyclists
South African male cyclists
Place of birth missing (living people)